An Evening with Elton John was a 1999 solo concert tour by Elton John.

After returning to full-time touring in 1997 John had focused his attention on touring with his band and touring with Billy Joel. This was the first time since returning to touring that John had performed a solo concert.

The tour started on 19 February 1999 in Roanoke, Virginia and ended on 20 November 1999 in Vancouver, British Columbia.

Tour dates

Setlists

References

External links

 Information Site with Tour Dates

Elton John concert tours
1999 concert tours